The 2017–18 Premier League International Cup was the fourth season of the Premier League International Cup, a European club football competition organised by the Premier League for under-23 players.
Porto defended the title by defeating Arsenal 1–0 in the final.

Format
The competition featured twenty-four teams: twelve from English league system and twelve invitees from other European countries. The teams were split into six groups of four - with two English league clubs per group. The group winners, and two best runners-up, progressed into the knockout phase of the tournament. The knockout matches were single leg fixtures.

All matches - including fixtures between non-English teams - were played in England and Wales.

Teams

English league system:
 Arsenal
 Derby County
 Everton
 Leicester City
 Liverpool
 Manchester United
 Newcastle United
 Reading
 Sunderland
 Tottenham Hotspur
 West Ham United
 Swansea City

Other countries:
 Bayern Munich
 VfL Wolfsburg
 Hertha Berlin
 Athletic Bilbao
 Villarreal
 Porto
 Benfica
 Celtic
 Dinamo Zagreb
 Legia Warsaw
 PSV Eindhoven
 Sparta Prague

Group stage

Group A

Group B

Group C

Group D

Group E

Group F

Ranking of second-placed teams

Knockout stages

Quarter-finals

Semi-finals

Final

References

2017-18
International Cup
2017–18 in European football
2017–18 in English football